Ceratoxancus melichrous is a species of sea snail, a marine gastropod mollusk in the family Costellariidae.

Description

Distribution
This marine species occurs off New Caledonia.

References

Costellariidae
Gastropods described in 1997